The 43rd edition of the World Allround Speed Skating Championships for Women took place on 13 and 14 February 1982 in Inzell at the Ludwig Schwabl Stadion ice rink.

Title holder was Natalya Petrusyova from the USSR.

Distance medalists

Classification

 * = Fall

Source:

References

Attribution
In Dutch

1980s in speed skating
1980s in women's speed skating
1982 World Allround
1982 in women's speed skating